Henry Townsend (1815–1886) was an Anglican missionary in Nigeria.  Ordained in England in 1842, Townsend set off for Sierra Leone, landing there that same year.  After working there only a few months, he was transferred to the Yoruba mission.

Career
From 1846 to 1867, he based his mission in Abeokuta.  Thomas Birch Freeman was actually the first European to enter Abeokuta.  He arrived there on 11 December 1843.  When he returned to Badagry on 24 December, he met Rev. Henry Townsend and they celebrated Christmas Day together sharing the Gospel in Badagry.  According to Ajisafe, he was the first European person to enter Abeokuta, arriving there on 4 January 1843 and was 'given a grand reception' (Ajisafe 1924: 85). Working with Samuel Crowther, a Yoruba Anglican priest, Townsend wrote several hymns in Yoruba and aided in the compilation of Crowther's Yoruba primer. From 1871 to 1872 Rev Henry and Mrs Townsend were co-principals of CMS Female Institution Lagos Nigeria. Rev Henry Townsend retired in 1876.

Reverend Henry Townsend published a Yoruba newspaper in 1859.  This is said to have started off the print media in Nigeria, the newspaper was first bilingual paper in Nigeria. The paper used 8 years before it demise.

See also
Agiya Tree Monument

Notes

References

External links
 Brief biography

English Anglican missionaries
Anglican missionaries in Nigeria
19th-century English Anglican priests
1815 births
1886 deaths
British expatriates in Nigeria
People from colonial Nigeria
Yoruba history
Abeokuta
Anglican missionaries in Sierra Leone